Plamondon station is a Montreal Metro station in the borough of Côte-des-Neiges–Notre-Dame-de-Grâce in Montreal, Quebec, Canada. It is operated by the Société de transport de Montréal (STM) and serves the Orange Line. It is located in the Snowdon neighbourhood of Côte-des-Neiges–Notre-Dame-de-Grâce. It opened on June 29, 1982 and replaced Côte-Sainte-Catherine station as the Orange Line's western terminus until the extension to Du Collège station was completed in 1984.

Overview 
The station is a normal side platform station with an entrance at either end. The northern entrance is integrated into a social housing project at the corner of Avenue Plamondon and Victoria Avenue. The southern entrance is located on the corner of Van Horne avenue and Victoria avenue near a commercial center and an elementary school. The station decor is divided in two to reflect the two entrances, with blue panels to the north and reddish-pink to the south.

The station was designed by Patrice Gauthier.

Origin of the name
This station is named for av. Plamondon, so named by Montreal city council in 1911 without a stated reason. It may be named for Quebec painter Antoine Plamondon (1804–1895) or singer Rodolphe Plamondon (1875–1940).

Connecting bus routes

Nearby points of interest
 Marche Victoria
 Congregation Shomrim Laboker
Collège rabbinique du Canada
Parc Nelson-Mandela
 Centre commercial Van Horne
Loisirs Sportifs Cote-Des-Neiges
 Van Horne Park
Plaza Côte-des-Neiges

References

External links
Plamondon Station - official web page
 Plamondon metro station geo location
Montreal by Metro, metrodemontreal.com
 2011 STM System Map
 Metro Map

Orange Line (Montreal Metro)
Railway stations in Canada opened in 1982
1982 establishments in Quebec
Côte-des-Neiges–Notre-Dame-de-Grâce